The dorab wolf-herring (Chirocentrus dorab) is a fish species from the genus Chirocentrus of the family Chirocentridae. It is a coastal fish, silvery below and bright blue above. It is found in both marine and brackish or estuarine waters, feeding on smaller fish and possibly crustaceans. Chirocentrus is from the Greek cheir meaning hand and kentron meaning sting. Dorab is from the Arabic language word darrab (ضرّاب)  and the word is probably a corrupted form of durubb (دُرُبّ) the name for goldfish in Arabic. It has another Arabic name, lisan (لسان)  which means tongue.

Description 

Dorab wolf-herring have slender, elongated bodies.

Range
The dorab wolf-herring is found in the Indo-Pacific, probably throughout the warmer coastal waters, from the Red Sea and East Africa to the Solomon Islands, north to southern Japan, south to northern Australia. Recently reported from Tonga.

Fisheries
The dorab wolf-herring is a commercial species which is sold fresh, dried, salted or frozen. It is also a game fish.

References

External links 
 Fishes of Australia : Chirocentrus dorab

dorab wolf-herring
Commercial fish
Marine fish of Northern Australia
dorab wolf-herring